Alconchel de Ariza is a municipality in the province of Zaragoza, Aragon, Spain. According to the 2004 census (INE), the municipality has a population of 128.

References

Municipalities in the Province of Zaragoza